Lemley is a surname. Notable people with the surname include:

Earl Lemley Core (1902–1984), botanist and botanical educator, researcher, author and local West Virginia historian
Harry Jacob Lemley (1883–1965), United States federal judge
Jack Lemley, the Chairman of the United Kingdom Olympic Delivery Authority until his resignation in 2006
Jim Lemley (born 1965), American film and television producer based in Paris and Los Angeles
Luther Henry Lemley (1914–1982), Railway system engineer. Designed and built the railway system for Liberia 1958–1963. Uncovered and exposed corruption in the Tubman/Talbot regimes. Author of "Liberia: An Inside Story".
Mark Lemley, the director of the Stanford University program in Law, Science & Technology

See also
Lemley Campus, the largest of Tulsa Technology Center campuses in Tulsa, OK, USA
Lemley-Wood-Sayer House, historic home located at Ravenswood, Jackson County, West Virginia, USA